"The Steadfast Tin Soldier" (Danish: Den standhaftige tinsoldat) is a literary fairy tale by Hans Christian Andersen about a tin soldier's love for a paper ballerina. The tale was first published in Copenhagen by C.A. Reitzel on 2 October 1838 in the first booklet of Fairy Tales Told for Children. New Collection. The booklet consists of Andersen's "The Daisy" and "The Wild Swans". The tale was Andersen's first not based upon a folk tale or a literary model.  "The Steadfast Tin Soldier" has been adapted to various media including ballet and animated film.

Plot
On his birthday, a boy receives a set of 25 toy soldiers all cast from one old tin spoon and arrays them on a table top. One soldier stands on a single leg because, as he was the last one cast, there was not enough metal to make him whole. Nearby, the soldier spies a pretty paper ballerina with a spangle on her sash. She, too, is standing on one leg, and the soldier falls in love. That night, a goblin among the toys in the form of a jack-in-the-box, who also loves the ballerina, angrily warns the soldier to take his eyes off her, but the soldier ignores him.

The next day, the soldier falls from a windowsill (presumably the work of the goblin) and lands in the street. Two boys find the soldier, place him in a paper boat, and set him sailing in the gutter. The boat and its passenger wash into a storm drain, where a rat demands the soldier pay a toll.

Sailing on, the boat is washed into a canal, where the tin soldier is swallowed by a fish. When this fish is caught and cut open, the tin soldier finds himself once again on the table top before the ballerina. Inexplicably, the boy throws the tin soldier into the fire, which is most likely the work of the jack-in-the-box goblin. A wind blows the ballerina into the fire with him; she is consumed by it. The maid cleans the fireplace in the morning and finds that the soldier has melted into a little tin heart, along with the ballerina's spangle, which is now burned as black as coal.

Publication
The tale was first published in Copenhagen, Denmark by C. A. Reitzel on 2 October 1838 in Fairy Tales Told for Children. First Collection. First Booklet  Other tales in the booklet include "The Daisy" and "The Wild Swans". The tale was republished in collected editions of Andersen's work, first, on 18 December 1849 in Fairy Tales and again on 15 December 1862 in the first volume of Fairy Tales and Stories.

Adaptations

Ub Iwerks did a 1934 Cinecolor cartoon based on the story entitled "The Brave Tin Soldier". The cartoon's plot is slightly different from the original story. The antagonist is not a Jack-in-the-Box, but rather a toy king who wants the ballerina for himself. The tin soldier attacks the king, and as a result is put on trial and sentenced to death via firing squad. The ballerina pleads for his life to be spared, but her pleas go ignored. She then stands alongside the tin soldier and both are shot into a burning fireplace, where he melts into the shape of a heart with her. The cartoon has a happy ending, as both the tin soldier and ballerina are sent to "Toy Heaven", where the tin soldier now has both legs.

In the 1940 Disney animated film Fantasia, a shorter/shortened version of the tale was planned for the film as indicated by 1938 storyboards. Unfortunately, the ending of the segment did not satisfy Walt Disney and the story was set aside.

George Pal's war-themed 1941 Puppetoon, "Rhythm in the Ranks", is likely a loose adaptation of Andersen's story, with a toy soldier getting discharged after falling in love with an ice-skating ballerina.

Paul Grimault (with Jacques Prévert) did a 1947 colour French cartoon Le Petit Soldat that portrayed the title character as a toy acrobat who is called to war and returns crippled but determined to rescue his ballerina.

Marcia Brown's 1953 picture book illustrating the story in M. R. James's translation was awarded a Caldecott Honor.

Ivo Caprino's 1955 puppet movie "The Steadfast Tin Soldier".

Shawn Phillips's 1964 song 'Little Tin Soldier' is also based on the Hans Christian Andersen tale and was covered by Donovan in 1965.

The Small Faces 1967 song Tin Soldier opens with the lyric "I am a little tin soldier that wants to jump into your fire", and appears to have been influenced by the Andersen story.

In 1971, the Japanese anime anthology series Andersen Monogatari made an episode adaptation.

Andersen's contemporary August Bournonville choreographed the tale for his ballet A Fairy Tale in Pictures, and George Balanchine choreographed the tale in 1975, allowing the soldier and the ballerina to express their love before the ballerina is blown into the fire.  Georges Bizet set the tale to music in Jeux d'Enfants.

In 1976, Soyuzmultfilm made an animated adaptation.

A live action musical adaptation was the second of four episodes of The Enchanted Musical Playhouse that originally aired from 1984 to 1985 on the (then) brand new Disney Channel.

In 1985, Harmony Gold made an English dub of The Little Train adaptation of the story, the film was originally made in Italy in the late 70s.

In 1986, Atkinson Film-Arts made an animated adaptation featuring the voices of Rick Jones, Terrence Scammell, and Robert Bockstael, with narration by Christopher Plummer.

In 1989, Studio Miniatur Filmowych made an animated adaptation.

In 1991, it was adapted into an animated television movie as part of Timeless Tales from Hallmark which was produced by Hanna-Barbera and Hallmark. It featured the voices of George Newbern as the Tin Soldier, Megan Mullally as the Ballerina, Tim Curry as the Jack-in-the-box and Paul Williams as a frog named Frogbauten. It was Curry's second clown role after he played Pennywise in It (1990).

Children's author Tor Seidler adapted the book in 1992, with illustrations by Fred Marcellino.

1995 saw Jon Voight make his directorial debut with The Tin Soldier, a Showtime family film loosely based on Andersen's story.

In 1996, Vivian Little and Kathleen Mills adapted Anderson's story into a full-length ballet for the Dance Fremont studio in Seattle. The ballet is still produced every winter, as an alternative to the popular Christmas ballet The Nutcracker, which many American studios produce in December. Dance Fremont centers the story around a young deaf boy who receives the toys for Christmas, and uses Signed Exact English for all dialogue.

In the 2000 Disney animated film Fantasia 2000, an adaptation of the tale is set to the first movement of the Piano Concerto No. 2 in F Major by Dmitri Shostakovich.  The segment differs slightly from Andersen's tale: there are only five soldiers, but still only one with one leg; the ballerina appears to be made of porcelain; the soldier is disappointed to discover the ballerina has two legs, but the ballerina still accepts him; at the end, the jack-in-the-box villain is the one that perishes in the fire instead of the soldier and ballerina who both remain in one piece.  Other animated films for children have been produced on the tale, and, in 1975, a science fiction fantasy feature film, The Tin Soldier.

In 2002 the series The Fairytaler adapted it in the story "The Hardy Tin Soldier".

The music video of Anastacia's 2005 song Heavy on My Heart was loosely inspired by Andersen's story.

In Stieg Larsson's 2006 thriller The Girl Who Played with Fire, the fiercely independent protagonist Lisbeth Salander compares the journalist Mikael Blomkvist, who had stayed loyal to her despite her repeated blatant rejection of him, with Andersen's steadfast tin soldier (implicitly comparing herself with Andersen's ballerina).

Mike Mignola's graphic novel Baltimore, or The Steadfast Tin Soldier and the Vampire fuses the poignancy of "The Steadfast Tin Soldier" with supernatural Dracula myths, set in a post-World War I environment.  Kate DiCamillo's The Miraculous Journey of Edward Tulane (2006) makes use of the tale's themes.

The Hanson song Soldier is also based on this fairy tale. The song doesn't mention the goblin at all. The tin soldier fell out the window when the wind blew and the tin soldier and ballerina melted together while dancing and the ballerina fell near the fireplace.

In Anirudh Arun's 2013 bildungsroman The Steadfast Tin Soldier?, the protagonist Ashwin is compared to the tin soldier by his successful brother Abhinav (the society thus plays the part of the dangerous jack-in-the-box).

Daft Punk's music video for the song "Instant Crush" is said to have been inspired by "The Steadfast Tin Soldier".

References
Footnotes

Works cited

External links

"Den Standhaftige Tinsoldat". Original Danish text
"Den Standhaftige Tinsoldat". Original Danish text (Royal Library)
“The Steadfast Tin Soldier“. English translation by Jean Hersholt

1838 short stories
Fictional soldiers
Danish fairy tales
Short stories by Hans Christian Andersen
Sentient toys in fiction
Male characters in fairy tales
Fictional amputees
Literary characters introduced in 1838